Grand Gateway Shanghai is an office complex consisting of two identical skyscrapers in the Xujiahui area of Shanghai, China. It was completed in 2005.

Design and construction
Grand Gateway was designed by Callison Architecture.

Construction of the towers was halted in 1997 due to the Asian financial crisis.  In 2002, construction resumed. The buildings were completed in 2005 and are currently the 4th tallest twin towers in the world. Each tower is 262 m high and has 52 stories.

The towers are the 71st tallest existing buildings in the world when measured up to the highest architectural point which is the top of the domes, and the 9th tallest in Shanghai, making them a landmark in the area. The height of the roof is 224.9 metres.

The Grand Gateway 66 shopping mall is located at the base of the towers. The podium contains 1.1 million square feet of retail and entertainment space.

There is also a residential development, called Grand Gateway Garden, consisting of two towers, each 100 m high.

See also
 List of tallest buildings in Shanghai

References

External links
 Official site
 
 
 
 

Buildings and structures completed in 2005
Skyscrapers in Shanghai
Hang Lung Group
Shopping malls in Shanghai
Skyscraper office buildings in Shanghai